This is a comprehensive, annotated list of compositions by Joseph Holbrooke. For a simplified version of this catalogue, arranged by opus number, see List of works by Joseph Holbrooke.

Holbrooke was notorious for continually revising and recasting his compositions in different forms:

"The most disconcerting aspect of any inquiry into the works of Holbrooke is that elucidation is not proportionate to the amount of facts unearthed: instead confusion, contradiction and complication tend to increase. It is characteristic that even the composer's name can be found in any combination of Joseph or Josef and Holbrook or Holbrooke. Many works bore various opus numbers at different periods; conversely, an opus number can be found attached to several different works; and the identity of some earlier compositions, particularly in the realm of chamber music, is difficult to trace because of recasting and incorporation into new definitive versions. It is in a way ironic that such a situation should arise with Holbrooke of all composers, for from the first he gave evidence of orderliness of mind in listing and designating his music (e.g. Poem No.2, Symphonic Quartet No.1); but revisions, rearrangements and reshufflings led to havoc from which not even works of later date, when the numbering system might have been expected to have settled down, are exempt."

Dramatic

Opera
 Varenka (c.1907) [possibly unfinished, no longer extant ]
 Pierrot and Pierrette, Op.36a (1908) [later revised as The Stranger ]
 Dylan, Son of the Wave, Op.53 (1909) [No.2 of the cycle The Cauldron of Annwn]
 The Children of Don, Op.56 (1910–12) [No.1 of the cycle The Cauldron of Annwn]
 The Enchanter, opera-ballet, Op.70 (1914) [originally assigned as Op.65, also titled The Wizard ]
 Bronwen, Op.75 (1915–24, revised 1928 ) [No.3 of the cycle The Cauldron of Annwn, originally assigned as Op.67 ]
 The Sailor's Arms, operetta, Op.105 (1925–30)
 The Snob, operetta, Op.114 (1920s) [originally assigned as Op.49, also assigned as Op.88, also assigned as Op.102 ]
 Tamlane, opera-ballet, Op.132 (1941–43)

Ballet
 Pierrot, ballet suite, Op.36b [for interpolation into the opera Pierrot and Pierrette, Op.36a (1908), adapted from the Pantomime suite, Op.16a (1896–97) ]
 The Revels
 Arlequin
 Columbine
 Pantalon
 Clown
 Tarantelle
 Coromanthe (c.1917) [also titled The Dawn of Love, no longer extant, originally assigned as Op.61 ]
 The Moth and the Flame, Op.62 (1912–17) [originally published under the pseudonym Jean Hanze]
 The Masque of the Red Death, Op.65 (1904–13) [originally assigned as Op.47, originally styled Poem No.8, also titled The Red Masque, originally published under the pseudonym Jean Hanze]
 The Palace Gates, outside - Entrance of the Guests
 Dance of the Buffoons, and the deformed
 The Violet Room - Dance of Prince Prospero
 The Blue Room - A Bacchanal Dance
 The Scarlet Room - Dance of Death
 Pandora (1919) [recast in Film Music Suite No.1, for dance orchestra and piano, Op.84 (c.1927)]
 Bronwen, ballet music, Op.75a (1929) [for interpolation into the opera Bronwen, Op.75]
 Welsh Dance No.1
 Welsh Dance No.2
 Welsh Dance No.3
 Irish Dance No.1
 Irish Dance No.2
 Aucassin and Nicolette, Op.115 (1935)

Incidental music
 Pontorewyn, Op.26c (1914) [originally assigned as Op.17 No.8 ]
 Llwyfan y byd, Op.117a (1935) [also titled Theatre of the World ]
 Beccles Tower, Op.117b (1930s)
 Harlech, pageant (1930s)
 Spalding, pageant (1930s)

Orchestral

Symphonies
 Les Hommages, Op.40 (1900, revised 1904) [styled both Symphony No.1  and Suite No.3, originally titled Bohemian Suite, originally assigned as Op.37 ]
 Festiva (Marcia heroique): Hommage à Wagner
 Serenata: Hommage à Grieg
 Elegiac Poeme: Hommage à Dvořák
 Introduction and Russian Dance: Hommage à Tschaikowsky
 Symphony No.1, Homage to E.A. Poe, Op.48 [see under Choral music]
 Symphony No.2, Apollo and the Seaman, Op.51 [see under Choral music]
 Symphony No.3 in E minor, Ships, Op.90 (1925) [also titled Nelson, also titled National Symphony, also titled Our Navy ]
 Warships
 Hospital Ships
 Merchant Ships
 Symphony No.4 in B minor, Homage to Schubert, Op.95 (1928, revised c.1933 and c.1943) [also titled The Little One ]
 Andante sostenuto. Mesto - Scherzo (Allegro marcato) - Trio: sostenuto (quasi meno)
 Andantino sostenuto - Poco andantino - Andante
 Finale: Allegro - Andante (con moto) - Allegro
 Symphony No.5 in E-flat, Wild Wales, Op.106 [see under Brass band]
 Symphony No.6 in G major, Old England, Op.107 [see under Military band]
 Symphony No.7 in D major, Al Aaraaf, for strings, Op.109 (1929) [arrangement of String Sextet, Henry Vaughan, Op.43 (1902), also styled Symphony No.6 ]
 Symphony No.8 in B-flat, Dance Symphony, Op.112 [see under Solo instruments and orchestra]
 Symphony [No.9], Milton, Op.131 [see under Choral music]

Other
 Intermezzo for small orchestra, Op.2b [arrangement of Intermezzo from Fourteen Pieces (for the young), for piano, Op.2a (1890s)]
 Suite for small orchestra, Op.10b
 Les Graces
 Les Fleurs
 Claire de lune
 L'Ardeur
 Pantomime, suite for strings, Op.16a (1897) [originally assigned as Op.24, also titled Pantomimic Suite, recast as Pierrot, ballet suite, Op.36b ]
 Arlequin
 Columbine
 Pantalon
 Clown
 The Raven [Poem No.1], Op.25 (1899–1900, revised 1903) [originally assigned as Op.19 ]
 The New Renaissance, overture (c.1902) [originally assigned as Op.28, no longer extant ]
 Ode to Victory (1901) [originally styled Poem No.2, originally assigned as Op.29, no longer extant ]
 The Viking [Poem No.2], Op.32 (1901, revised 1912) [originally styled Poem No.3, originally titled The Skeleton in Armour, also titled The Corsair ]
 Ulalume [Poem No.3], Op.35 (1903) [originally styled Poem No.4 ]
 Three Blind Mice, Symphonic variations on an old English Air, Op.37 (1900) [originally assigned as Op.40 ]
 Dreamland, suite, Op.38 (c.1900)
 Ensemble
 The Dance
 Dreaming
 Hilarité
 Three Concert Waltzes (c.1904) [originally assigned as Op.44, no longer extant ]
 Dylan, fantasie, Op.53a (1910) [based on music from the opera Dylan, Op.53, also styled Prelude]
 Imperial March (1914) [another version of Triumphal March, for chorus and orchestra, Op.26a (1902, revised 1909) ]
 The Wild Fowl, fantasie, Op.56b (1918) [originally titled The Wild Sea-Fowl, based on music from the opera The Children of Don, Op.56]
 Variations on Auld Lang Syne, Op.60 (1904, revised c.1918) [originally assigned as Op.53, also titled Portraits ]
 Variations on The Girl I left behind me, Op.64 (1904–05) [originally assigned as Op.48, later assigned as Op.37b ]
 Hymn to Caridwen, Op.75b (1924) [based on music from the opera Bronwen, Op.75]
 Caradoc's Dream, for string orchestra, Op.75c (c.1920) [based on music from the opera Bronwen, Op.75]
 Six Pieces for Small Bands, Op.84 (c.1927) [originally cast as Film Music Suite No.1, for dance orchestra and piano ]
 Pandora
 Bennetta
 Colomba
 Joandis
 Tintinnabulo
 Jamboreena
 Light Dance Music, for dance orchestra (1922–25), Op.86a [originally assigned as Op.86 ]
 The Penguin's Walk, foxtrot (1923)
 Let's brighten Bognor, foxtrot (1922)
 Let's brighten London, foxtrot (1923)
 In Old Wales, foxtrot (1925)
 Do It Now, foxtrot (1925)
 Toc H, valse (1924)
 Let's brighten everything, valse (1923)
 British Legion, valse (1925)
 Broken China, valse (1925)
 Tell No Tales, charleston (1925)
 The Birds of Rhiannon, Op.87 (1925) [based on music from the operas Dylan, Op.53, The Children of Don, Op.56 and Bronwen, Op.75]
 Bogey Beasts, suite, Op.89b (c.1925) [based on Bogey Beasts for piano, Op.89a]
 Eight Pieces for Small Bands, Op.91 (c.1928) [originally cast as Film Music Suite No.2, for dance orchestra and piano ]
 Impromptu
 Arenig
 Carneval
 Casanova
 Marimba
 Flammella
 Serenade Appassionata
 Charivari
 Suite for Saxophone Band, Op.93b (c.1928) [related to Purple Rhythms for military band, Op.93a, and Danse Suite for piano and small orchestra, Op.93c, also cast as Suite for saxophone (or clarinet) and piano, Op.93b]
 Bohemia
 Old Times
 Andalusia
 Soulmate
 Heliotrope
 Carnation
 Danse Suite, for piano and small orchestra, Op.93c (c.1928) [related to Purple Rhythms for military band, Op.93a, and Suite for Saxophone Band, Op.93b, originally cast as Film Music Suite No.3, for dance orchestra and piano ]
 Amethyst
 Turquoise
 Ultramarine
 Purple
 Bohemia
 Ecstacies
 Cambrian Suite, Op.101 (c.1936)
 Morfa Rhuddlan
 All thro' the Night
 David of the White Rock
 Welsh Dances
 National Suite, Op.102a
 Scotch Dances
 Balfe - a Souvenir
 Old English Dances (Come Lasses and Lads)
 Irish Dances
 Bristol Suite, for small orchestra, Op.116a
 Symphonietta in D major for wind and brass, The Sleeper, Op.118 (c.1930) [also styled Symphony No.9, also assigned as Op.111 ]
 Amontillado, dramatic overture, Op.123 (1935)
 Suite No.1, for string orchestra, Op.125a (late 1930s) [based on Eldorado, suite for piano, Op.102b ]
 Suite No.2, for string orchestra, Op.125b (late 1930s) [based on The Lake, suite for piano, Op.102c ]
 The Pit and the Pendulum, fantasie, Op.126 (1929) [based on music from the opera-ballet The Enchanter, Op.70 ]
 The Descent into the Maelstrom, fantasie (1930s) [probably no longer extant ]

Solo instruments and orchestra
 Cello Concerto (early 1900s) [originally assigned as Op.26, no longer extant, possibly recast as Fantasie-Sonate, for cello and piano, Op.19 (1904)]
 Piano Concerto in F minor, Dramatique (1896–1900) [also styled Poem No.5, no longer extant, originally assigned as Op.30, later assigned as Op.36, recast as The Song of Gwyn ap Nudd [Piano Concerto No.1], Op.52 ]
 Tragic March, for horn and orchestra, Op.51b (c.1930) [based on music from Apollo and the Seaman, dramatic symphony, Op.51 (1907) ]
 The Song of Gwyn ap Nudd [Piano Concerto No.1], Op.52 (1906–08, revised 1923) [also styled Poem No.7, derived from Piano Concerto in F minor, Dramatique (1896–1900) ]
 Maestoso Allegro - Animato - a tempo - Tempo primo - Più mosso al fine
 Poco adagio con sentimento - Tempo poco allegretto poco scherzando - Tempo I
 Allegro, molto fuoco - Tempo poco larghetto - Tempo primo - Poco lento - L'istesso tempo (Doppio) - Cadenza - Grandioso - brilliante
 Violin Concerto in F major, The Grasshopper, Op.59 (1909, revised 1916 and 1928) [also titled The Lyrical ]
 Allegro con molto fuoco
 Adagio non troppo con molto espressione
 Maestoso - Vivace giocoso
 Concerto for Saxophone (or Bassoon) in B flat, Op.88 (1927) [originally assigned as Op.85 ]
 Barcarolle (Allegretto grazioso)
 Serenade (Allegretto e espressivo)
 Rondo (Con brio)
 Piano Concerto No.2, L'Orient, Op.100 (1920–28) [derived from The Orient, fantasies for solo piano ]
 Javanese Dance
 Burmese Dance
 Singhalese Dance
 Cello Concerto in E-flat major, The Cambrian, Op.103 (1936)
 Andantino
 Adagio con espressione
 Finale: Andantino sostenuto - Allegro vivace
 Symphony No.8 in B-flat, Dance Symphony, for piano and orchestra, Op.112 (1928–30) [also styled Piano Concerto No.3, also styled Symphony No.5, also titled The Colonies, also titled Bon-Bon, also assigned as Op.100 ]
 Terpsichore
 Dance of Passion
 In Savannah
 Double Concerto for clarinet, bassoon and orchestra, Tamerlane, Op.119 (1937–39) [also styled Concertino ]
 Allegro maestoso
 Andante sostenuto
 Allegro con brio
 Concertino for violin and cello (1937–39) [an adaptation of the Double Concerto, Op.119 ]
 Quadruple Concerto for flute, clarinet, English horn, bassoon and orchestra, Op.133 (1947 )
 Allegro con brio
 Valse vibrations
 A la polka

Brass band
 Girgenti (c.1920) [originally assigned as Op.69a, arrangement of Mezzotints for clarinet and piano, Op.55 No.7 ]
 The Butterfly of the Ballet (c.1920) [originally assigned as Op.69b, arrangement of Mezzotints for clarinet and piano, Op.55 No.6 ]
 A Hero's Dream (c.1920) [originally assigned as Op.69c, arrangement of Mezzotints for clarinet and piano, Op.55 No.2 ]
 Dylan, selection (1920s) [based on music from the opera Dylan, Op.53]
 The Children of Don, selection (1920s) [based on music from the opera The Children of Don, Op.56]
 Suite, op.85 (1920s)
 Air de Ballet
 Oriental Dance
 Ballathona
 In Mandalay
 Clive of India, dramatic overture, Op.96a (c.1937-39) [originally titled 1914 ]
 Three Trinidad Songs, Op.96b
 Symphony No.5 in E-flat, Wild Wales, Op.106 (1920) [also titled Old Wales, also styled Symphony No.8 ]
 Rhayader
 Bangor Fair
 Llangefni
 Song of Llewellyn, Op.110b (1930s)
 Don, fantasie, Op.127 [also titled Gwydion of Don, based on music from the opera The Children of Don, Op.56]

Military band
 National March, Op.26b [arrangement of Op.26a]
 Empedocles, serenade, Op.61a (1912) [also titled To Kesh, arrangement of Mezzotints for piano, Op.49 No.4 (1906)]
 Gwyn, serenade, Op.61b [arrangement of Serenade for twelve instruments, Op.61b (1916)]
 Purple Rhythms, suite, Op.93a (late 1920s)
 Amethyst
 Turquoise
 Nocturne
 Purple
 Symphony No.6 in G major, Old England, Op.107 (1928) [also styled Symphony No.7 ]
 The Lass of Richmond Hill
 Down Among the Dead Men
 Gentlemen of Old England
 Suite, Op.110a

Chamber music
 Six Pieces for violin and piano, Op.3
 Melodie
 On the Rhine
 Berceuse
 Polka
 Scherzo
 Valse Melancolique
 Two Poems for violin and piano, Op.5 (1896)
 Ballade
 Legende
 Violin Sonata No.1, Op.6a (late 1890s, revised 1906) [also styled Sonatina ]
 Allegro: Marcato e moderato
 Nocturne: Adagio e molto espressivo
 Scherzo: Presto ma non troppo
 Rondo: Allegro con moto
 Adagio and Rondo for clarinet and piano, Op.6b (1893–94)
 Five Pieces for mandolin, violin and piano, Op.8 [originally cast as Three Pieces for mandolin and piano, or two mandolins and two guitars (1900)]
 Bon Jour
 Entr'acte
 Nocturne
 Sérénade Arabienne
 Valse Characteristique
 Nine Pieces for violin and piano, Op.12
 March
 Moorish Dance
 Recollection
 Berceuse
 Caprice
 Valse Lente
 Neapolitan
 Reconcilliation
 Valse Serenade
 Cavatina and Variations [Clarinet Quintet No.1], Op.15b (1910) [Cavatina later incorporated into Clarinet Quintet, Op.27 ]
 Fantasie Quartet [String Quartet No.1 in D minor], Op.17b (1904)
 Departure
 Absence
 Return
 Fantasie-Sonate, for cello and piano, Op.19 (1904)
 Sextet, The Dances, Op.20 (1894, revised 1906)
 Bohemian Dance
 Valse Triste [also titled Ländler]
 Plantation Dance
 Tarantelle
 Piano Quartet No.1 in G minor, Op.21 (1905, revised 1920) [originally cast as a Piano Trio (1898) ]
 Allegro marcato, ma non troppo
 Lament: Larghetto, e molto espressione
 Finale: Maestoso - Allegro
 Six Pieces for violin or cello and piano, Op.23
 Serenade Orientale
 Humoreske
 Souvenir
 Remembrance
 Serenade
 Souvenir de Printemps
 Clarinet Quintet No.2 in G, Ligeia, Op.27 (1910, revised 1939 and c.1956) [also titled Fate, originally cast as a Horn Quintet (1901) ]
 Maestoso moderato - Poco allegro cantabile
 Canzonet: Andante affetuoso
 Poco vivace
 Trio for violin, horn and piano in D major, Op.28 (c.1904) [originally assigned as Op.25, also titled Byron ]
 Larghetto sostenuto - Allegro con brio
 Adagio ma non troppo
 Molto vivace
 Piano Quartet No.2 in D minor, Byron, Op.31 (1896–98, revised 1902)
 Allegro feroce, e vigoroso
 Adagio sostenuto (quasi recitativo)
 Con brio (molto animato)
 Sextet for piano and strings or wind, Israfel, Op.33a (1901) [also titled Soul, originally cast as a Quintet for piano and wind (1890s) ]
 Allegro appassionato non troppo
 Adagio molto espressione sostenuto
 Vivace marcato
 Miniature Characteristic Suite, for wind quintet, Op.33b (1897)
 In the Fields
 A Joyous Moment
 Minuet
 Lament
 Fanfare [also titled Une Fête]
 String Sextet in D major, Henry Vaughan, Op.43 (1902) [originally assigned as Op.16, also titled Al Aaraaf ]
 Adagio espressivo e molto sostenuto - Allegro con brio
 Andantino mesto
 Finale: Molto vivace
 Piano Quintet, Diabolique, Op.44 (1904)
 Allegro, molto fuoco, agitato
 Andante, molto espressione e sostenuto
 Valse (Diabolique): Valse grazioso
 Finale: Poco vivace
 Sextet for piano and strings, In Memoriam, Op.46 (1905) [originally cast as a Piano Quintet (c.1903) ]
 Allegro
 Adagio
 Poco vivace - Adagio
 Mezzotints, for clarinet (or violin) and piano, Op.55 [subject to frequent revision ]
 Nocturne
 Albania
 L'Extase [based on a theme from the first movement of the Clarinet Quintet No.2 in G, Ligeia, Op.27]
 Celtic Elegie
 From Syracuse
 The Butterfly [also titled The Butterfly of the Ballet ]
 Girgenti, cavatina [arrangement of Mezzotint for piano, Op.49 No.3]
 Spring Song, canzonetta [simplified and truncated arrangement of the second movement of the Clarinet Quintet, Op.27 ]
 Eileen Shona, for clarinet and string quartet or piano (c.1920) [originally included in Mezzotints, Op.55, also assigned as Op.74, later used as a replacement for the second movement of the Clarinet Quintet, Op.27 ]
 Trio for oboe, clarinet (or viola) and piano, Fairyland, Op.57 (1911) [also styled Nocturne ]
 String Quartet No.2, War Impressions, Op.58a (1915)
 Belgium
 Russia [based on a theme from the final movement of Les Hommages, suite for orchestra, Op.40 ]
 Violin Sonata No.2, Romantic, Op.59a (1917) [arrangement of the Violin Concerto, Op.59]
 Serenade for oboe d'amore, clarinet, basset horn, two saxhorns, viola, five saxophones and harp, Op.61b (1916) [also assigned as Op.52a, also titled Gwyn, based on a theme from the second movement of The Song of Gwyn ap Nudd [Piano Concerto No.1], Op.52]
 String Quartet No.3, The Pickwick Club, Op.68 (1916)
 Mr. Pickwick - A Field-day - Snodgrass and Winkle - Joe, the fat boy - The amorous Mr. Tupman - The Picnic - Miss Rachel - They ride - The horse shies! - The card party
 The romantic side of Mr. Pickwick - Sam Weller - "Mr. Jingle" (alias Trotter) - "The first of September" (Tupman and Winkle with the guns!) - Mr. Pickwick and Mrs. Bardell - Dodson and Fogg - Pickwick. His dignity unimpaired
 Folksong Suite No.1 for string quartet [String Quartet No.4], Op.71 (c.1916)
 Come Lasses and Lads
 The Last Rose of Summer
 Mavourneen Deelish
 Strathspeys and Reels
 Folksong Suite No.2 for string quartet [String Quartet No.5], Op.72 (c.1917) [also styled String Quartet No.2, also titled Song and Dance ]
 Strathspeys
 Song of the Bottle
 All Through the Night
 Irish Jigs
 Celtic Suite for violin and piano, Op.72a (1917) [arrangement of Folksong Suite No.2 for string quartet [String Quartet No.5], Op.72 (c.1917)]
 Folksong Suite No.3 for string quartet [String Quartet No.6], Op.73 (c.1918)
 The Girl I left behind me
 Soldier's Song
 David of the White Rock
 Auld Lang Syne
 Danse Moderne, for violin and piano, Op.73b
 Nocturne, for violin and piano, Op.74b
 Violin Sonata No.3, Orientale, Op.83 (1926)
 Cyrene, for clarinet and piano, Op.88a (1930) [arrangement of the slow movement from the Saxophone Concerto in B flat, Op.88 (1927)]
 Suite for saxophone (or clarinet) and piano, Op.93b [arrangement of Suite for Saxophone Band, Op.93b, related to Purple Rhythms for military band, Op.93a, and Danse Suite for piano and small orchestra, Op.93c]
 Bohemia
 Old Times
 Andalusia
 Soulmate
 Heliotrope
 Carnation
 Phryne, nocturne for saxophone, clarinet, bassoon, violin or flute and piano (1939) [arrangement of Nocturne from Purple Rhythms for military band, Op.93a]
 Serenade in D-flat for flute, oboe, clarinet and bassoon, Op.94a (1929)
 Moonlight on the Water
 Sad Memories
 Scherzo Caprice
 Eulalie, ballade for horn and piano, Op.94b [originally styled Ballade in A minor and assigned as Op.51b, based on a theme from Apollo and the Seaman, dramatic symphony, Op.51]
 Sonata for alto saxophone (or bassoon) and piano, Op.99 [arrangement of Saxophone Concerto in B-flat, Op.88 (1927)]
 Cambria, Suite No.1 for string quartet, Op.101 [arrangement of Cambrian Suite for orchestra, Op.101]
 Suite for flute and piano, Op.116b
 Apollo, quintet for four clarinets and piano, Op.120 [also assigned as Op.120b, also assigned as Op.120c, also assigned as Op.51b, possibly related to Apollo and the Seaman, dramatic symphony, Op.51]
 Arietta, for harp and flute, Op.120b (1930s)
 Irene, nonet for two violins, viola, cello, double bass, flute, oboe, clarinet and bassoon, Op.129 (late 1930s)
 Bassoon Quintet, Eleanora, Op.134 (1940s)
 Octet for wind, double bass and horn, Over Many Lands, Op.135 (1951 )
 Trinidad
 Barbados
 Colerado
 Jangolo (Teneriffe)
 Kesh (Ireland)
 Tueuman & Fugue

Piano
 Ten Pieces (for the young), Op.2a (1890s)
 Study in G
 Study in B-flat
 Study in F
 A Pleading Child, bagatelle
 A Wilful Child, bagatelle
 Suave Dance, bagatelle
 Petit Mazurka, bagatelle
 Dance Rustique, bagatelle
 Intermezzo
 The Old Home
 Ten Pieces, Op.4 (1890s)
 Three Blind Mice, valse
 Mazurka
 Valse
 Orientale
 Scaramouche
 Pantalon
 Scherzo
 Harlequinade
 Carneval
 Alsacienne
 Eleven Pieces (for the young), Op.10a (1890s)
 A Happy Thought
 Forgotten
 Valse Gracieuse
 Columbine
 Acrobats
 Matinee
 Valse Noble
 Les Graces
 Scherzino, bagatelle
 Petite Romance, bagatelle
 Gnomes, bagatelle
 Seven Pieces, Op.17a (1890s)
 Clair de lune
 For the King, march
 Coquette, valse
 Le Crepuscule
 Gavotte
 Barcarolle
 A Valentine
 Miniature Suite, Op.18a (1890s) [originally titled Kleine Suite ]
 Whims
 Valse Grotesque
 Scherzo
 Affection
 Sorrow
 Suite moderne, Op.18b (1893–96)
 Scherzo Humoristique
 Valse Romanesque
 Nocturne [also titled By the Sea ]
 Bacchanale [also titled L'Orgie - Bacchanale Fantasie ]
 Coromanthe, waltz for two pianos, Op.18c [probably relating to the orchestral ballet Coromanthe (late 1910s) which is no longer extant]
 Ten Rhapsodie Etudes, Op.42 (1898–1905)
 Caprice
 Poursuivant
 Energique
 La Fantastique
 Nuit Tenebreuse
 Nocturne
 Toccata
 Fantoches
 Valse Fantasie
 Novelette
 Duo in D major, for two pianos, Op.43a [arrangement of String Sextet in D major, Henry Vaughan, Op.43 (1902)]
 Impressions of a Tour: Ten Mezzotints, Op.49 (1906)
 Bay of Naples
 Palermo
 Girgenti
 Empedocles
 Malta
 Syracuse
 Adriatic
 Brindisi
 Corfu
 Marseilles
 Book of Wonder, suite, Op.58b (early 1920s)
 Golden Dragons
 Troubadours
 Jackdaws
 Prelude and Fugue, for two pianos, Op.63a [arrangement of Grand Prelude and Fugue for organ, Op.63 (1917)]
 Four Futurist Dances, Op.66 (1914) [originally assigned as Op.59c, originally published under the pseudonym Jean Hanze]
 Leprechaun Dance
 Demon's Dance
 Troglodyte Dance
 Trollops' Dance
 Jamaican Dances, Set 1 Ring Tunes, Op.67 No.1 (1922) [originally published as Op.85]
 Where's My Lover?
 Hear Duppy Talk
 Ring a Diamond
 On the carpet
 Oh! Palmer Oh!
 Baby
 Jamaican Dances, Set 2 Digging Sings, Op.67 No.2 (1922) [originally published as Op.85]
 Ring Dance
 Deggy Dance
 Teacher Bailey
 Rosy-bell-o!
 Little Sally Water
 Drill him constab
 Jamaican Dances, Set 3 Ring Tunes, Op.67 No.3 (1922) [originally published as Op.85]
 Poor Little Zeddy
 Clip-clap
 Timber lay
 Rub 'im down Joe
 Hallo! me honey
 Jump, shamador
 Jamaican Dances, Set 4 Dancing Tunes, Op.67 No.4 (1922) [originally published as Op.85]
 Crahss lookin' dog
 Marty go home
 Bah-lim-bo
 All me money
 Jimmy Rampy
 Koromante Dance
 An Enchanted Garden, suite, Op.70a (c.1920) [based on music from the opera-ballet The Enchanter, Op.70]
 A Ray of Sunshine
 Chasing the Butterfly
 Brownies
 Celtic Suite, Op.72b (1917) [largely based on Folksong Suite No.2 for string quartet [String Quartet No.5], Op.72 (c.1917)]
 Uliam Dhoan
 All Through the Night
 Song of the Bottle
 Strathspeys
 The Orient, fantasies
 Javanese (Pepper Dance) [also titled Procession at Batavia, assigned as Op.77  and Op.80, incorporated into Piano Concerto No.2, L'Orient, Op.100]
 Burmese (Sacrifice of Water Buffaloes) [originally assigned as Op.81, incorporated into Piano Concerto No.2, L'Orient, Op.100]
 Singhalese (Dancing) [originally assigned as Op.82, incorporated into Piano Concerto No.2, L'Orient, Op.100]
 Sumatrese [originally assigned as Op.83 ]
 Siamese [originally assigned as Op.84 ]
 Barrage, Op.78a (1920)
 The Shaving of Shagpat, suite, Op.78b (1920)
 The Palace of Aklis
 Dance of Bagarag
 Dance of Gladness
 Talsarnau, concert valse, Op. 79 (1920)
 Dolgellau [Cambrian Ballad No.1], Op.80 (early 1920s)
 Penmachno [Cambrian Ballad No.2], Op.81 (early 1920s)
 Tan-y-Grisiau [Cambrian Ballad No.3], Op.82 (early 1920s)
 Memories of Trinidad, Op.86b (c.1920)
 Buying a buggy
 Dry grassfire
 Oh me toad oh
 David Logan
 Bogey Beasts, Op.89a (1923) [also includes a song, The Ta-Ta, as a final number]
 The Caush
 The Seekim
 The Wily Grasser
 The Gorobobble
 The Oop Oop
 The Zoom
 The Nunk
 The Two-Tailed Sogg
 The Iffysaurus
 The Snide
 The Pst
 The Moonijim
 The Snaitch
 The Prapsnot
 Eldorado, suite, Op.102b
 Dreamland [also titled Caradoc's Lament]
 Eldorado
 Bridal Ballad
 The Lake, suite, Op.102c
 A Dream
 The Lake
 The River
 The Coliseum
 Maentrog [Cambrian Ballad No.4], Op.104 (1920s) [originally assigned as Op.88 ]
 Eight Nocturnes, Op.121 (1939)
 Gulnare [based on music from the poem for orchestra The Viking, Op.32]
 Donegal [based on music from the Piano Quartet No.1 in G minor, Op.21]
 Juliet [based on music from the poem for chorus and orchestra Queen Mab, Op.45]
 Elan [based on music from the opera Dylan, Op.53]
 Bridal Ballad [taken from Eldorado, suite for piano, Op.102b ]
 Bronwen [based on music from the opera Bronwen, Op.75]
 Ariel
 Ulalume [based on music from the poem for orchestra Ulalume, Op.35]
 Fantasie-Sonata No.1, The Haunted Palace, Op.124 (late 1930s) [based on music from the Dramatic Choral Symphony Homage to E.A. Poe, Op.48 ]
 Fantasie-Sonata No.2, Destiny, Op.128b (late 1930s) [also titled The Man of the Crowd, also titled Vulcan ]

Organ
 Grand Prelude and Fugue, Op.63 (1917) [the fugue subject using a principal theme from the operatic trilogy The Cauldron of Annwn, originally published under the pseudonym Jean Hanze]
 Suite No.1 in B-flat, Op.111 (1930s)
 Tragic March
 Wedding March
 Funeral March
 Toccata
 Nocturne, Op.116c
 Suite No.2, Op.122 (1930s)
 Bridal March
 La Lune, nocturne
 Tragic March
 Irish Song
 Suite No.3, Op.128a (1930s)
 Chorale
 Regrets
 Vision (Ullapool)
 Devotion
 Bridal March at Ballybogey

Choral music
 Hymn Tunes and Anthems, Op.1
 O Day of Rest and Gladness
 March to the Master's Bidding
 We are Children
 Hear My Voice, O God
 Now When Jesus
 Hear, O My People
 Now Thank We All Our God
 Six Choral Songs, Op.9
 Spring is Cheery [SATB]
 She's Up and Gone [SATB]
 I Will Woo the Rose [SATTB]
 Gentle Spring [SSA]
 Woodlark [SSA]
 Thro' Groves Sequestered [SSATB]
 Eight Choral Songs, Op.16b
 The Labourer's Song [SATB]
 Some Folks [SSAA]
 The Wanderers [SSAA]
 In Fairyland [TTBB, originally assigned as Op.47 No.4 ]
 The Hour [SATB]
 Rag and Bone Man [SSA]
 Battle Psalm [TTBB]
 In London Town [unison]
 National March, for chorus and orchestra, Op.26a (1902, revised 1909) [originally assigned as Op.52b, later assigned as Op.23b, also titled Triumphal March ]
 Heaven and Earth, dramatic cantata (c.1904) [originally assigned as Op.55, possibly unfinished, no longer extant ]
 Byron, for chorus and orchestra [Poem No.4], Op.39 (1904) [originally styled Poem No.6, originally titled Ode to Byron ]
 Queen Mab, for chorus and orchestra [Poem No.5], Op.45 (1902) [originally styled Poem No.7 ]
 Eight Choral Songs, Op.47
 Footsteps of Angels [SATB]
 To Zante [SSATTB]
 Jean Richepin's Song [TTBB]
 To Thee, Wales [SATB]
 Tomlinson [SSA, also titled The Shirker ]
 Captain Wattle [TTBB]
 Drink the Swizzy [TTBB]
 Now, all is Well [SATB]
 Homage to E.A. Poe, dramatic choral symphony, for soprano, alto, tenor and bass soli, chorus and orchestra, Op.48 (1902–06, revised 1908) [also styled Symphony No.1 ]
 The Haunted Palace
 Hymn to the Virgin
 The City in the Sea
 The Valley Nis
 The Bells, for chorus and orchestra [Poem No.6], Op.50 (1903) [originally styled Poem No.9 ]
 Prelude
 Sledge Bells
 Wedding Bells
 Alarm Bells
 Iron Bells
 Apollo and the Seaman, dramatic symphony [Symphony No.2], for male chorus and orchestra, Op.51 (1907)
 Apollo's Coming; The Rumour; The Ship
 The Tidings
 The Tale of Apollo; The Rebuke
 The New Ship; The Embarkation
 Psalms of David, for chorus and orchestra (c.1928-1930) [originally assigned as Op.101, possibly unfinished and no longer extant ]
 Choral Songs, Op.108
 England [SATB]
 Laugh and be Merry [SATB]
 Choral Songs, Op.113
 The Rolling English Road [SATB]
 Wine and Water [SATB]
 Hymn before action [SATB or unison]
 Blake, choral symphony (1930s) [originally assigned as Op.122, unfinished]
 Songs of Innocence, Op.130a (1934–36) [related to Blake, unfinished choral symphony (1930s), see also under Songs]
 Spring [SSA]
 The Blossom [SAT]
 The Divine Image [TTBB]
 Another's Sorrow [SSAATTBB]
 Hear the Bard, Op.130b (c.1934) [SATBarB, from Blake, unfinished choral symphony (1930s) ]
 Milton, choral symphony [Symphony No.9], Op.131 (1938–46) [possibly unfinished ]

Songs
 Seven Songs, for voice and piano, Op.7
 Fair Phyllis
 Wild Rose
 Love Symphony [also scored for orchestra ]
 I Cannot Tell
 Golden Daffodils
 There's a Garden
 Moonshine
 Six Songs, for voice and piano, Op.11
 Summer Sweet
 Bonnie Dear
 Tulip's Wooing
 Sheila
 Honor Bright
 Grant Us Thy Peace
 Eight Songs, for voice and piano, Op.13
 Love Foregone
 Goodmorrow
 Where's Mother?
 I Came at Morn
 We are Violets
 Love's Answer
 Sailor's Bride
 You are Love
 Bohemian Songs, for baritone and orchestra, Op.14 (1898–1904)
 Unto My Foe
 Liberty
 Ere your beauty
 Story of a Drum
 A Free Lance
 Twenty Years Ago
 Five Songs, for voice and piano, Op.15a
 In Sunshine Clad
 A Voice
 A Winter Night
 The Sea Hath Pearls
 Autumn
 Six Characteristic Songs, for voice and piano, Op.22
 Sympathy
 Battle Song
 Tag and Bobtail
 Follow the Gleam
 Come to the West
 Seawards
 Six Lyrical Songs, for voice and piano, Op.24
 Tho' all the stars
 Love and I
 They love indeed
 A Fairy
 To Dianeme
 Night and Day
 Six Dramatic Songs, for voice and piano, Op.29
 Come, let us make love deathless [also scored for orchestra ]
 I heard a soldier
 My own sad love
 O dreamy, gloomy, friendly trees
 The Requital
 Dark, dark the seas
 Six Romantic Songs, for voice and piano, Op.30
 A Lake and a Fairy Boat
 To My Wife
 Come not when I am dead [also scored for string quartet ]
 A Farewell
 To a Cold Lover
 The Stars
 Six Landscapes, for voice and piano, Op.34
 Along the Path
 The Shadows
 High Noon
 Grey Evening
 Night
 Stay, my love
 Marino Faliero, scena for bass or baritone and orchestra, Op.41a (1905) [also assigned as Op.41b ]
 Annabel Lee, ballade for baritone or tenor and orchestra Op.41b (1905) [also assigned as Op.41a ]
 Five Songs, for voice and piano, Op.54
 Killary (1909) [also scored for small orchestra, also scored for string quartet ]
 An Outsong
 Where be you going?
 Think not of me
 My Jean
 Garden of Irem [originally included additionally in Songs, Op.54 ]
 Five Dramatic Songs, for voice and piano, Op.69
 Bronwen's Song [from the opera Bronwen, Op.75]
 The Coward's Exit
 Come not when I am dead [also included in Six Romantic Songs, Op.30]
 Clown's Song (1921)
 Bacchus (1921)
 Six Songs, for voice and piano, Op.74
 Taliessin's Song (1920) [with clarinet obbligato, from the opera Bronwen, Op.75]
 The Price (1922)
 Dolly (1922)
 Homeland (1924) [also titled England, with oboe obbligato]
 The Old School (1923)
 The Bathers [with flute obbligato] (1923)
 Three Songs, for voice and string quartet, Op.76
 Music Comes
 Pack clouds away
 The Bells of Heaven
 Six Socialist Songs, for voice and piano, Op.77 (1919–23)
 Salutation [with oboe and viola obbligati]
 The Garret
 The East Wind
 The Tea Shop Girl [with clarinet obbligato]
 The Tame Cat [with clarinet obbligato]
 Face Your Game
 The Ta-Ta, for voice and piano, Op.89 No.15 [final number of Bogey Beasts, Op.89 (1923) for piano]
 Twelve Drinking Songs, for voice and piano, Op.92 [also titled Twelve Sporting Songs ]
 The Cocktail
 Saint George
 The Newest Music
 The Wicked Grocer
 The Song of Stout
 Tinker, Tailor
 The Saracen's Head
 The Folks in Liverpool
 Jolly Good Ale
 The God in the Barley
 Labour in Vain
 Song against Songs
 Six Songs, for voice and piano, Op.97 (c.1928-29)
 Love the Leveller
 Gold
 In an Almond Tree
 If birds can soar
 Triolets
 Seedtime and Harvest
 Six Songs, for voice and piano, Op.98 (c.1929-30)
 More Sweet
 The Hill
 O Life
 My Senses
 The Forbidden Vision
 The Motor Bus
 Let there be light, for voice and piano, Op.109b
 Songs of Innocence, for voice and piano, Op.130a (1934–36) [related to Blake, unfinished choral symphony (1930s), see also under Choral music]
 Piping Down the Valleys
 Echoing Green
 The Lamb
 The Shepherd
 Infant Joy
 The Blackboy
 Laughing Song
 Cradle Song
 Nurse's Song
 Holy Thursday
 The Chimney Sweeper
 Night
 A Dream
 Little Boy Lost
 Last Two Songs, for voice and piano (c.1954)
 Beauty's daughters
 Oh, lovely Haidee

Notes

References
 Barnett, Robert Joseph Holbrooke - works (selective list), Grove Music Online.
 British Library (1981–1987) The Catalogue of Printed Music in the British Library to 1980, K. G. Saur, London.
 Holbrooke, Joseph (1904) Musical works by Josef Holbrooke 1895-1904, Breitkopf & Härtel, Leipzig and London.
 Holbrooke, Joseph (1924) List of complete works by Josef Holbrooke, Goodwin & Tabb, London. [typescript]
 Holbrooke, Joseph (1924) Josef Holbrooke and his work, Goodwin & Tabb, London.
 Holbrooke, Joseph (c.1929) Complete list of the works of Josef Holbrooke, Paxton & Co., London.
 Holbrooke, Joseph (c.1930) Important musical works (very rarely heard in this country) by Josef Holbrooke, Modern Music Library, London.
 Holbrooke, Joseph (c.1930) Complete list of orchestral, chamber and choral works, Modern Music Library, London.
 Holbrooke, Joseph (c.1930) Complete list of the published songs and pianoforte works, Modern Music Library, London.
 Holbrooke, Joseph (c.1931) Printed catalogue of works, Modern Music Library, London. [Birmingham University Library MS79/16/14]
 Holbrooke, Joseph (1937) Josef Holbrooke - Various appreciations by many authors, Rudall Carte, London.
 Holbrooke, Joseph (1937) List of Joseph Holbrooke's Poeana, Rudall Carte, London.
 Holbrooke, Joseph (c.1937-40) Complete list of works for wind instruments, Modern Music Library, London.
 Holbrooke, Joseph (1940) Joseph Holbrooke's 8 symphonies, Modern Music Library, London.
 Holbrooke, Joseph (c.1940) Complete list of the works (mechanically produced) of Josef Holbrooke, Modern Music Library, London.
 Holbrooke, Joseph (1941) Complete list of Holbrooke's published musical works, Modern Music Library, London.
 Holbrooke, Joseph (1946) Josef Holbrooke's music dramas, ballets, pageants, etc., Modern Music Library, London.
 Holbrooke, Joseph (c.1950) A list of choral songs, Modern Music Library, London.
 Holbrooke, Joseph (c.1950) National works by Josef Holbrooke, Modern Music Library, London.
 Holbrooke, Joseph (1952) Complete list of the musical works of Josef Holbrooke, Modern Music Library, London.
 Lowe, George (1920) Josef Holbrooke and his work, Kegan Paul, London.
 Thompson, Kenneth (1965) Holbrooke - some catalogue data (Music and Letters XLVI(4), p. 298)

Holbrooke, Joseph